Parta hic is a 1976 Czechoslovak film. The film starred Josef Kemr.

References

External links
 

1976 films
Czechoslovak comedy films
1970s Czech-language films
Czech comedy films
1970s Czech films